Blessing Nnabugwu Diala (born 8 December 1989) is a footballer who plays as a forward for Equatorial Guinean women's league club Deportivo Evinayong.

Born in Nigeria, she is a member, as a naturalized citizen, of the Equatorial Guinea women's national team. She was part of the team at the 2011 FIFA Women's World Cup.

Honors and awards

National team
Equatorial Guinea
Africa Women Cup of Nations: 2008

References

External links

1989 births
Living people
Place of birth missing (living people)
Nigerian women's footballers
Women's association football forwards
Sunshine Queens F.C. players
Bobruichanka Bobruisk players
Nigerian expatriate women's footballers
Nigerian expatriate sportspeople in Belarus
Expatriate women's footballers in Belarus
Nigerian emigrants to Equatorial Guinea
Naturalized citizens of Equatorial Guinea
Equatoguinean women's footballers
Equatorial Guinea women's international footballers
2011 FIFA Women's World Cup players